Christian Vassilakis Garcia (born 28 February 2001), known as Vassi, is a Spanish professional footballer who plays as a forward for Móstoles on loan from Real Madrid Castilla.

Career
Born in Valencia, Vassilakis played for Valencia, Villarreal and UD Alboraya growing up before joining Real Madrid in 2017. In September 2020, he joined Liga Portugal 2 side Arouca on a season-long loan deal. On 1 November 2020, Vassilakis made his professional debut, coming on as a substitute in a 2–1 win over Vizela. In August 2021, he joined Primera División RFEF side Tudelano on loan for the season. On 28 January 2022, he dropped down a division to join Móstoles on loan until the end of the season.

Personal life
Vassilakis holds both Spanish and Greek citizenship.

References

External links

2001 births
Spanish footballers
Living people
Association football forwards
Footballers from Valencia (city)
Spanish people of Greek descent
F.C. Arouca players
Liga Portugal 2 players
Spanish expatriate footballers
Expatriate footballers in Portugal
Spanish expatriate sportspeople in Portugal
CD Tudelano footballers
Primera Federación players
CD Móstoles URJC players